Lake Saint Francis is a lake which borders southeastern Ontario, southwestern Quebec and northern New York State. It is located on the Saint Lawrence River between Lake Ontario and Montreal, Quebec. The lake forms part of the Saint Lawrence Seaway.

The city of Salaberry-de-Valleyfield is located at the east end of the lake.

Lac Saint-François National Wildlife Area, located on the south shore of the lake, protects wetlands located on the shores of the lake. This area provides important habitat for Redhead ducks and other waterfowl. Thousands of migrating waterfowl stop over in this region. In 1987, it was recognized as a wetland of international significance under the Ramsar Convention.

The Charlottenburgh Marsh, including Cooper Marsh, is an important wetland area located on the north shore of the lake.

References

External links
 St-Francis Jigger

Saint Francis
Saint Francis
Landforms of the United Counties of Stormont, Dundas and Glengarry
Ramsar sites in Ontario
Borders of Quebec
Borders of Ontario
Canada–United States border
Tourist attractions in Montérégie
Saint Lawrence River
Le Haut-Saint-Laurent Regional County Municipality
Vaudreuil-Soulanges Regional County Municipality